Acton is a small hamlet in Northumberland, north-east England, about  south of Allendale Town.  Acton is usually Anglo-Saxon Old English for "farmstead at the oak tree(s)";  here, though, it is "Acca's farmstead".  Acca is an Anglo-Saxon settler's forename.

Acton is in the parliamentary constituency of Hexham.

Hamlets in Northumberland